State Road 105 (NM 105) is a state highway in the US state of New Mexico. NM 105's southern terminus is at NM 94, and the northern terminus is north of Rociada at the end of state maintenance.

Major intersections

See also

References

105
Transportation in San Miguel County, New Mexico
Transportation in Mora County, New Mexico